Howes Cave is a hamlet in Schoharie County, New York, United States. Howes Cave has a post office with ZIP code 12092, which opened on November 18, 1867.

The hamlet's name comes from Howe Caverns, a popular tourist attraction discovered by Lester Howe in 1842. It is also home to Secret Caverns, a tourist attraction similar to Howe Caverns.

References

Hamlets in Schoharie County, New York
Hamlets in New York (state)